The Critics' Choice Television Award for Best Supporting Actress in a Drama Series is one of the award categories presented annually by the Critics' Choice Television Awards (BTJA) to recognize the work done by television actresses. It was introduced in 2011, when the event was first initiated. The winners are selected by a group of television critics that are part of the Broadcast Television Critics Association.

Winners and nominees

2010s

2020s

Multiple wins
2 wins

 Christina Hendricks (consecutive)
 Thandiwe Newton

Multiple nominations
4 nominations
 Christine Baranski

3 nominations
 Emilia Clarke
 Julia Garner
 Anna Gunn
 Regina King
 Audra McDonald
 Rhea Seehorn

2 nominations
 Gillian Anderson
 Ann Dowd
 Christina Hendricks
 Kelly Macdonald
 Margo Martindale 
 Thandiwe Newton
 Maggie Siff
 Maura Tierney
 Susan Kelechi Watson
 Constance Zimmer

See also
 TCA Award for Individual Achievement in Drama
 Primetime Emmy Award for Outstanding Supporting Actress in a Drama Series
 Golden Globe Award for Best Supporting Actress – Series, Miniseries or Television Film

References

External links
 

Critics' Choice Television Awards
Television awards for Best Supporting Actress